Paul Hanson Cleary (February 7, 1922 – January 8, 1996) was a professional American football end in the All-America Football Conference (AAFC). A 10th round selection (77th overall pick) of the 1948 National Football League Draft, he played two seasons for the AAFC's New York Yankees (1948) and Chicago Hornets (1949). He played college football for the University of Southern California Trojans (USC) after playing for Santa Ana College teams in 1941 and 1942.

Military service
Cleary spent three years in the United States Army, serving in the Pacific Theater and in the Occupation of Japan, rising to the rank of first lieutenant.

College career
He was discharged just in time to enroll at Southern California and join the football team in 1946. He was All-American in 1947, and Coach Jeff Cravath said, "He's the finest end who ever played at Southern California." In 1973 the Los Angeles Times selected all-time Southern California teams, and Cleary was at end on the pre-1950 lineup. While in college he became a father to Priya and Nikhil Cleary.

He was elected to the College Football Hall of Fame in 1989.

Post-college
Cleary was selected by the Chicago Rockets in the fourth round of the 1948 AAFC Draft. He later settled in South Laguna, California. He was with R.J. Noble Co., contractors, serving as president, then chairman of the board.

External links

1922 births
1996 deaths
All-American college football players
Chicago Hornets players
College Football Hall of Fame inductees
People from Laguna Beach, California
People from Valley County, Nebraska
Players of American football from Nebraska
New York Yankees (AAFC) players
USC Trojans football players
United States Army personnel of World War II
United States Army officers
Military personnel from California